Roller hockey was played at the Mediterranean Games in 1955 in Barcelona. Italy became champion followed by Spain and France.

Men's tournament

Medal table

External links 
1955 Mediterranean games results - International Mediterranean Games Committee

Roller hockey
Mediterranean Games